The 2019–20 Texas A&M–Corpus Christi Islanders women's basketball team represented Texas A&M University–Corpus Christi in the 2019–20 NCAA Division I women's basketball season. The Islanders were led by seventh-year head coach Royce Chadwick, and played their home games at the American Bank Center and the Dugan Wellness Center, as members of the Southland Conference. They finished the season 23–7, 17–3 in Southland play to finish in first place. Before they could play in the Southland women's tournament however, the tournament was cancelled due to the coronavirus pandemic.

Previous season
The Islanders finished the 2018–19 season 17–16 overall, 8–10 in Southland play to finish in a tie for sixth place. As the No. 6 seed in the Southland women's tournament, they defeated New Orleans in the first round, Nicholls in the quarterfinals, Stephen F. Austin in the semifinals, before losing a close game to No. 4 seed Abilene Christian, 68–69 in the championship game.

Media
Video streaming of all non-televised home games and audio for all road games is available at GoIslanders.com.

Roster
Sources:

Schedule and results

|-
!colspan=9 style=| Non-conference exhibition season

|-
!colspan=9 style=| Non-conference regular season

|-
!colspan=9 style=| Southland regular season

|-
!colspan=9 style=| Non-conference regular season

|-
!colspan=9 style=| Southland regular season

|-
!colspan=9 style=| 2020 Hercules Tires Southland Basketball Tournament
|-

See also
 2019–20 Texas A&M–Corpus Christi Islanders men's basketball team

References

Texas A&M–Corpus Christi Islanders women's basketball seasons
Texas AandM-Corpus Christi
Texas AandM-Corpus Christi Islanders basketball
Texas AandM-Corpus Christi Islanders basketball